Saint John is an unincorporated community in Hardin County, Kentucky, United States.

The community took its name from the nearby St. John the Baptist Catholic church.

References

Unincorporated communities in Hardin County, Kentucky
Unincorporated communities in Kentucky